Yahya Abdul-Mateen II (born July 15, 1986) is an American actor. He is known for his roles as Black Manta in the superhero films Aquaman (2018) and Aquaman and the Lost Kingdom (2023), Bobby Seale in the Netflix historical legal drama The Trial of the Chicago 7 (2020), and Morpheus / Agent Smith in The Matrix Resurrections (2021). For his portrayal of Cal Abar / Doctor Manhattan in the HBO limited series Watchmen (2019), he won a Primetime Emmy Award for Outstanding Supporting Actor in a Limited Series or Movie. He also starred in episodes of The Handmaid's Tale (2018) and Black Mirror (2019).

Early life and education 
Abdul-Mateen was born in New Orleans, Louisiana, to a Muslim father, Yahya Abdul-Mateen I (1945–2007), and a Christian mother, Mary. He is the youngest of six children. He spent his childhood in the Magnolia Projects of New Orleans, and then moved to Oakland, California, where he attended McClymonds High School. At McClymonds, he was an athlete (he played against future NFL champion Marshawn Lynch) and self-described geek who enjoyed chess. He was also prom king. The family was eventually priced out of Oakland and moved to Stockton, California.

During his time at the University of California, Berkeley, where Mateen became initiated as a member of Alpha Phi Alpha and competed as a hurdler for the California Golden Bears, a teammate suggested he take a theater class; that class helped him overcome his stutter. He graduated with a degree in architecture, and then worked as a city planner in San Francisco. After being laid off from his job, he used the opportunity to apply to drama schools, in which he was accepted by New York University Tisch School of the Arts, the Institute for Advanced Theater Training at Harvard University, and Yale School of Drama; he graduated from Yale with a Master of Fine Arts degree and worked as a stage actor.

Career 
Early in his career, Abdul-Mateen was adamant about not altering his Muslim name or using a stage name, countering the implications that having a Muslim name would impede his success. In 2016, Abdul-Mateen began his acting career with Stephen Adly Guirgis and Baz Luhrmann's musical drama series The Get Down, which premiered on Netflix. His character Clarence "Cadillac" Caldwell is a prince of the disco world. He was praised for his performance in the series.

In 2017, Abdul-Mateen appeared in Shawn Christensen's drama film The Vanishing of Sidney Hall, in the role of Duane. It premiered at the 2017 Sundance Film Festival.

Abdul-Mateen played a police officer, Garner Ellerbee, in the action comedy film Baywatch along with Dwayne Johnson and Zac Efron, and directed by Seth Gordon. The film was released on May 25, 2017. He also played WD Wheeler, a smart hand-to-hand acrobat partner, in the musical film The Greatest Showman (2017), which also starred Efron, as well as with Hugh Jackman, Michelle Williams, Rebecca Ferguson, and Zendaya, about American showman P.T. Barnum.

In 2018, he starred in the road trip drama film Boundaries, along with Vera Farmiga and Christopher Plummer, directed and written by Shana Feste; and played DC Comics villain Black Manta in the film Aquaman, which started shooting in May 2017 in Australia. In 2018, Abdul-Mateen was cast in a flashback part as the main character's father in the horror film Us, directed by Jordan Peele, which was released in March 2019.

In February 2019, it was confirmed that Abdul-Mateen was in talks to star in the Jordan Peele-produced Candyman reboot as the title character, with Nia DaCosta directing. The film was released in theaters on August 27, 2021, to positive reviews.

In March 2019, it was announced that Abdul-Mateen was cast in the fifth season of Netflix's science-fiction anthology series Black Mirror. Later in the year, he played Cal Abar, known as Doctor Manhattan, in the HBO superhero drama miniseries Watchmen, which earned him his first Emmy Award for Outstanding Supporting Actor in a Limited Series or a Special in September 2020.

Abdul-Mateen starred in the role of Morpheus (an alternate version of the character) in the film The Matrix Resurrections.

Abdul-Mateen is currently starring in the Broadway revival of Topdog/Underdog alongside Corey Hawkins.

In October 2022, it was announced that Abdul-Mateen was cast in the Marvel Cinematic Universe Disney+ series Wonder Man as the titular character.

Personal life
Abdul-Mateen lives in New York City. After his father's death in 2007, Abdul-Mateen began researching his family history, explaining that "My father grew up and passed away with the longing to know where his father was from and about his father’s history." His father had West Indian heritage, although the country of origin is unknown.

Filmography

Film

Television

Theatre

References

External links 
 

1986 births
Living people
21st-century American male actors
African-American architects
African-American male actors
American male television actors
American people of West Indian descent
Male actors from New Orleans
People from Oakland, California
Outstanding Performance by a Supporting Actor in a Miniseries or Movie Primetime Emmy Award winners
Outstanding Performance by a Cast in a Motion Picture Screen Actors Guild Award winners
UC Berkeley College of Environmental Design alumni
Yale School of Drama alumni
21st-century African-American people
20th-century African-American people
African-American Muslims